Mount Dobson is a ski resort on the South Island of New Zealand. Located 2.25 hours from Christchurch and 3 hours from Queenstown, it claims an easy access road, the highest car park of any ski resort in New Zealand, and the earliest start to the season in 2006. The resort caters primarily to skiers of intermediate ability, with a 1:2:1 ratio of beginner/intermediate/advanced slopes.

The resort is situated in a 3 kilometre wide treeless bowl, facing south west between Fairlie and Tekapo. Other features include a natural half pipe, the "largest, sunniest learner/intermediate slope in New Zealand" and groomed main trails. There is no accommodation at the resort, and visitors are directed to nearby Fairlie. The peak for which the ski field is named, officially Dobson Peak, rises to  immediately to the north of the ski field.

The ski field was put up for sale on the 22nd of October 2014.

References

External links
Home
Overview - Mt Dobson Ski Area ski resort

Dobson
Dobson